The 1954 Rugby League World Cup was rugby league football's first World Cup and was held in France in October–November 1954. Officially known as the "Rugby World Cup", four nations competed in the tournament: Australia, France, Great Britain and New Zealand. A group stage was held first, with Great Britain topping the table as a result of points difference. They went on to defeat France (who finished second in the table, level on points) in the final, which was held at Paris' Parc des Princes before 30,368 spectators.

The prime instigators behind the idea of holding a rugby league world cup were the French, who were short of money following the seizing of their assets by French rugby union in the Second World War. The first rugby league world cup was an unqualified success. It was played in a uniformly good spirit, provided an excellent standard of play and was a fitting celebration of France's 20th anniversary as a rugby league-playing nation. The trophy, which was donated by the French, was worth eight million francs.

Background 

The World Cup was a French initiative. Led by Paul Barrière, who donated the Rugby League World Cup trophy himself, they had been campaigning for such a tournament since before the Second World War. Teams from Australia, Great Britain, New Zealand and the United States were invited to join the hosts, France, for the first World Cup in 1953. However, the tournament was not held until 1954, with all teams except the United States participating. The French had suggested that the United States play but the other nations were concerned about a lack of competitiveness which was borne out by France beating the United States 31–0 on 9 January 1954. It had been suggested that Wales be invited instead of the USA but they weren't approached.

The uncertainty of the ultimate outcome was of particular interest. In the early 1950s all four competing nations were quite capable of beating each other – no test series in the period was a foregone conclusion.

If there were a favourite it was Australia who had just won back the Ashes. However, in 1953 they had lost series to both the French and the Kiwis, while Great Britain had defeated New Zealand on the second half of their 1954 Australasian tour.

The form book merely provided a conundrum which was made more confusing when the British were forced, through injuries and players making themselves unavailable, to select a raw and largely untried squad which was given little credibility by the cynics.

The captains for this historic event were Puig-Aubert (France), Cyril Eastlake (New Zealand), Clive Churchill (Australia) and Dave Valentine (Britain). The referees were Warrington's Charlie Appleton and Rene Guidicelli (Perpignan).

Teams

Venues 
The games were played at various venues in France with the Final played at the Parc des Princes in Paris.

Round-robin

Group stage

Knockout stage

Final

The 1954 Rugby League World Cup Final was the conclusive game of the 1954 Rugby League World Cup tournament and was played between France and Great Britain on November 13, 1954 at Parc des Princes, Paris, France.

Try scorers 
6
  Gordon Brown
5

  Raymond Contrastin

4

  David Rose

3

  Alex Watson
  Gerry Helme
  Phil Jackson
  Frank Kitchen

2

  Ken Kearney
  Kel O'Shea
  Harry Wells
  Vincent Cantoni

1

  Roy Bull
  Peter Diversi
  Greg Hawick
  Jean Audoubert
  Joseph Crespo
  Guy Delaye
  Joseph Krawzyck
  Jacques Merquey
  Jimmy Ledgard
  Cyril Eastlake
  Jimmy Edwards
  Lenny Eriksen
  Ron McKay

Notes

References

General